Yhlas Saparmämmedowiç Saparmämmedow (born 25 February 1997) is a Turkmen footballer who plays for Turkmen club Köpetdag Aşgabat and the Turkmenistan national team.

Career statistics

International

References

External links 

1997 births
Living people
Turkmenistan footballers
Turkmenistan international footballers
Association football midfielders